Eucal "Uke" Clanton (February 19, 1898 – February 24, 1960) was a Major League Baseball first baseman who played for one season. Nicknamed "Cat", he played for the Cleveland Indians for one game on September 21, 1922. Clanton was one of a group of players that Indians player-manager Tris Speaker sent in partway through the game on September 21, 1922 done as an opportunity for fans to see various minor league prospects.

Clanton died in an automobile accident in Antlers, Oklahoma.

References

External links

1898 births
1960 deaths
Cleveland Indians players
Major League Baseball first basemen
Baseball players from Missouri
Minor league baseball managers
Road incident deaths in Oklahoma
Ada Herefords players
Coffeyville Refiners players